Putilov is a Russian masculine surname, its feminine counterpart is Putilova. It may refer to
Alexander Putilov (born 1952), Russian businessman
Aleksei Putilov (1866–1940), Russian banker and industrialist
Nikolay Putilov (1820-1880), Russian industrialist